Jo Coenen (born 30 September 1949, in Heerlen) is a Dutch architect and urban planner. He studied architecture at the Eindhoven University of Technology (graduating in 1975), and later held professorships at TU Karlsruhe, Eindhoven University of Technology and Delft University of Technology.

Between 2000 and 2004 Coenen was Chief Government Architect of the Netherlands (Rijksbouwmeester). In 1995 he won the BNA Kubus award. He is honorary member of the Association of German Architects (BDA).

Architecture projects
1986 Library and gallery, Heerlen
1986 City Hall, Delft
1993 Netherlands Architecture Institute, Rotterdam
1997 Emerald Empire (residential), Amsterdam
1999 Centre Céramique, Maastricht
1999 Q 30 (Gendarmenmarkt), Berlin
2002 DOCK, Düsseldorf
2003 Renovatie Glaspaleis, Heerlen
2006 Vesteda Tower, Eindhoven
2007 Mosae Forum, Maastricht
2007 Central library Openbare Bibliotheek Amsterdam, Amsterdam
2012 Innova Tower, Floriade 2012, Venlo
under construction Onderwijs- en cultuurcomplex (OCC), The Hague

Urban planning
1989 Master plan Vaillantlaan, The Hague
1990 Master plan KNSM Island, Amsterdam
1991 Master plan Céramique, Maastricht
2005 Master plan Arts Cluster, Tilburg
2006 Master plan Belval, Luxembourg
2019 Master plan Leidsche Rijn Centrum, Utrecht
developing Master plan Eco-quartier Fluvial, Mantes la Jolie

Bibliography
Jo Coenen, The Discovery of Architecture. Mit H. Ibelings. Berlin, 1991. 
Jo Coenen, From Urban Design to Architectural Detail. With contributions by Umberto Barbieri, Neave Brown, Otto Maier et al. Hamburg, 2005.

Gallery

Notes

External links

Dutch urban planners
1949 births
Living people
Academic staff of the Delft University of Technology
Academic staff of the Karlsruhe Institute of Technology
Academic staff of the Eindhoven University of Technology
Eindhoven University of Technology alumni
People from Heerlen
20th-century Dutch architects
21st-century Dutch architects